Xiong Guiyan (born 6 March 1976) is a Chinese para table tennis player. She won a silver medal at the 2016 Summer Paralympics held in Rio de Janeiro, Brazil. She also won the silver medal in the women's individual C9 event at the 2020 Summer Paralympics held in Tokyo, Japan.

Before she became disabled, Xiong was a table tennis prodigy. She represented her home province Heilongjiang in national competitions when she was 13. However, she was soon diagnosed with Garre's sclerosing osteomyelitis, and the pain forced her to retire in 1997, after the National Games. She got married and moved to Jiangmen, and did not play the sport seriously again until she was 37.

References

1976 births
Living people
Table tennis players at the 2016 Summer Paralympics
Table tennis players at the 2020 Summer Paralympics
Paralympic medalists in table tennis
Medalists at the 2016 Summer Paralympics
Medalists at the 2020 Summer Paralympics
Chinese female table tennis players
Paralympic silver medalists for China
Paralympic table tennis players of China
Table tennis players from Heilongjiang
People from Yichun, Heilongjiang
21st-century Chinese women